Stewart Easton (born 10 October 1981) is a Scottish former football midfielder who is the assistant manager at Thorniewood United.

He last played for Gartcairn Juniors in the Scottish Junior Football Association, West Region. He has previously in the Scottish Football League  with Airdrie, Greenock Morton, Albion Rovers, Stenhousemuir, where he was club captain, and Elgin City.

After moving into the Junior game, Easton was part of the Bathgate Thistle side which won the Scottish Junior Cup in 2008. He is the younger brother of former Dundee United player Craig Easton.

He became assistant manager of Gartcairn in 2015.

Easton moved to become assistant at Thorniewood United, working under new manager Gerry Bonham, in February 2017.

Honours
Bathgate Thistle
 Scottish Junior Cup: Winner 2007-08

References

External links

1981 births
Living people
Airdrieonians F.C. (1878) players
Greenock Morton F.C. players
Albion Rovers F.C. players
Stenhousemuir F.C. players
Elgin City F.C. players
Bathgate Thistle F.C. players
Gartcairn F. A. Juniors players
Scottish Football League players
Scottish Junior Football Association players
Scottish footballers
Association football midfielders
Footballers from Coatbridge